Welborne is a proposed new town to the north of Fareham, England, intended to include 6,000 houses with businesses and community facilities. 
A plan for the development was submitted for central Government examination on 23 June 2014, and modifications were published in January 2015 following the inspector's preliminary comments. Fareham Borough Council formally adopted the plan for Welborne as part of its statutory Local Plan for the Borough on 8 June 2015. Construction is scheduled in phases between 2015 and 2036, and  the town was due to be completed by 2038. Transport plans include an upgrade to Junction 10 of the M27 motorway and a bus rapid transit route.

The Campaign to Protect Rural England is against the building of the town, describing the site as "a natural barrier from the urban sprawl of the Solent cities" and calling for the area to be designated a green belt. In 2011, a petition with 1,400 signatures objecting to a new town was submitted to the Council.

Fareham Borough Council voted to impose Compulsory Purchase Orders on landowners on the planned site in 2016. The council expressed concern in 2018 that the planned houses could be unaffordable A submitted design for the site was rejected by the Planning Inspectorate in 2018, over concerns that the area's infrastructure would be inadequate.

The Planning Inspectorate Hearings into Welborne took place in 2014. By 2022 building was yet to start, with the completion date for the first houses having become scheduled for 2023/24. On 6 June 2022 the Planning Inspectorate examined the 2037 Fareham Local Plan, and in the post-hearing letter noted that he considered completion of the first Welborne houses by 2023/24 to be "overly ambitious" and that the site "should be pushed back a year in the trajectory".

References

Planned communities in England
Fareham